The Great Wall (also called Coma Wall), sometimes specifically referred to as the CfA2 Great Wall, is an immense galaxy filament. It is one of the largest known superstructures in the observable universe. 

This structure was discovered c. 1989 by a team of American astronomers led by Margaret J. Geller and John Huchra while analyzing data gathered by the second CfA Redshift Survey of the Center for Astrophysics  Harvard & Smithsonian (CfA).

Characteristics

The term "Great" has been added to distinguish it as an even larger type compared to standard galaxy walls. Great walls are so rare that only five or possibly six (if the disputed Hercules–Corona Borealis Great Wall is counted) of them have been discovered to date.

The CfA2 Great Wall has the maximum dimensions of either 500 million or 750 million light years depending on the figure and the reference used. It is 200 million light years in width and about 16 million light years in thickness. Its nearest point is about 300 million light years from Earth, while its farthest point is 550 million light years away. It consists of three massive galaxy superclusters: Hercules, Coma, and Leo.

The CfA2 Great Wall includes the Coma Filament.

Components

It was discovered in 1989 by Margaret Geller and John Huchra based on redshift survey data from the CfA Redshift Survey.

It is not known how much farther the wall extends due to the light absorption in the plane of the Milky Way galaxy in which Earth is located. The gas and dust from the Milky Way (known as the Zone of Avoidance) obscure the view of astronomers and have so far made it impossible to determine if the wall ends or continues on further than they can currently observe.

In the standard model of the evolution of the universe, such structures as the Great Wall form along and follow web-like strings of dark matter. It is thought that this dark matter dictates the structure of the Universe on the grandest of scales. Dark matter gravitationally attracts baryonic matter, and it is this "normal" matter that astronomers see forming long, thin walls of super-galactic clusters.

See also

 List of largest cosmic structures
 CMB cold spot
 Cosmic string
 Galaxy filament
 The Giant Arc
 Large-scale structure of the universe
 Redshift survey
 Sloan Great Wall

References

External links
 Map of CfA2 Great Wall
 The CfA Redshift Survey

Astronomical objects discovered in 1989
 
Galaxy filaments
Large-scale structure of the cosmos